The 1972–73 Weber State Wildcats men's basketball team represented Weber State College during the 1972–73 NCAA University Division basketball season. Members of the Big Sky Conference, the Wildcats were led by second-year head coach Gene Visscher and played their home games on campus at Wildcat Gym in Ogden, Utah.

The conference tournament was three years away, and for the sixth consecutive season, Weber State won the Big Sky title and played in the 25-team NCAA tournament. In the West regional at nearby Logan, they met Jerry Tarkanian's fourth-ranked Long Beach State 49ers in the first round for the third time in the four years. The Wildcats led by two points at the half, but lost by a dozen.

Weber's next NCAA appearance was five years later in 1978.

Senior center Rich Cooper and senior guard Brady Small were named to the all-conference team; junior guard Dan Dion and senior forward Ken Gubler were on the second team.

Postseason result

|-
!colspan=9 style=| NCAA tournament

References

External links
Sports Reference – Weber State Wildcats: 1972–73 basketball season
2015–16 Media Guide: 1972–73 season

Weber State Wildcats men's basketball seasons
Weber State
Weber State